Victoria Taylor may refer to:

Victoria Addison Taylor, second wife of Liberian president Charles Taylor
Victoria Taylor (Reddit), Reddit employee whose firing caused controversy
Victoria Taylor (politician), British politician

See also
Vicki Lee Taylor